Johan Svensson (born 22 January 1981) is a Swedish footballer who plays for Kristianstads FF on loan from Mjällby AIF as a midfielder.

References

External links

1981 births
Living people
Association football defenders
Östers IF players
Mjällby AIF players
Allsvenskan players
Superettan players
Swedish footballers